Buddleja bullata is a variable species endemic to the Andes, from Venezuela south through Colombia and Ecuador to Peru, at elevations of 1,800–3,600 m, where it grows on stream beds and in the remnants of montane forest. The species was first described and named by Kunth in 1818.

Description
Buddleja bullata is a dioecious shrub or small tree 1 – 10 m high, with a greyish-tan bark. The branches are subquadrangular and tomentose. The membraneous or subcoriaceous leaves are elliptic, lanceolate or ovate, 8–22 cm long by 3–8 cm wide, glabrescent, often bullate, above and covered with a white or yellowish tomentum below. The cream or yellow inflorescences are paniculate 7–25 cm long by 7–20 cm wide, comprising globose heads about 1 cm in diameter, each with 6–12 flowers; the corollas are 2.5–3.5 mm long.

Hybrids
The species is believed to hybridize with B. pichinchensis in the wild.

Cultivation
The shrub is not known to be in cultivation.

References

bullata
Flora of South America
Trees of Colombia
Trees of Ecuador
Trees of Peru
Trees of Venezuela
Plants described in 1818
Dioecious plants